Moritz Broschinski (born 23 September 2000) is a German footballer who plays as a forward for VfL Bochum.

Career

Energie Cottbus 
Broschinski began his professional career at FC Energie Cottbus, where he had spent much of his youth career. He made his debut for the first team on 4 February 2018, coming on as a 64th-minute substitute in a 0-0 draw vs. FSV Budissa Bautzen. He scored his first goal later that season, in a 2-1 win over FSV Wacker Nordhausen on 22 April 2018.

The following season, he made 13 appearances in all competitions, scoring once in the Brandenburgpokal.

In the 2019–20 season, Broschinski made 23 league appearances, scoring six goals. He also scored three goals in the 2020-21 Brandenburgpokal.

Borussia Dortmund II 
Ahead of the 2020–21 season, Broschinski joined Borussia Dortmund II. He made his debut on 12 December 2020, coming on as a 83rd-minute substitute vs. VfB Homberg.

VfL Bochum
On 22 January 2023, Broschinski signed for Bundesliga club VfL Bochum for an undisclosed fee on a three-and-a-half year deal.

References

External links

 Profile at DFB.de
 Profile at kicker.de
 

2000 births
Living people
People from Finsterwalde
Footballers from Brandenburg
German footballers
Association football forwards
FC Energie Cottbus players
Borussia Dortmund II players
VfL Bochum players
3. Liga players
Regionalliga players